Escape Under Pressure (also known as Under Pressure and The Cruel Deep) is a 2000 American disaster action film starring Rob Lowe. It was directed by Jean Pellerin.

Plot
An extremely rare artifact on a Greek island sets off a ferocious battle on the deck of a sinking ferryboat.

Cast
 Rob Lowe as John Spencer
 Larisa Miller as Chloe Spencer
 Craig Wasson as Elgin Bates
 Harry Van Gorkum as Crowley
 Tommy Hinkley as Carl
 Scott Anthony Viscomi as Nikos Gavras

Reception
Escape Under Pressure received very poor reviews from critics. Nate Yapp from Cinema Blend criticized every aspect of the film, from the script to the actor's performances, passing through "the worst CGI ever". Yapp concludes, stating: "Whatever happened to TV-movie pride (I know I'm digging deep here, folks). The medium used to be a way for up and coming directors to get some exposure (a la Steven Spielberg and John Carpenter). Now it seems to be an excuse to keep actors like Lowe and Corbin Bernsen in the public eye, if only for two hours". In the review aggregator site Rotten Tomatoes the movie holds a 0% rating.

References

External links
 
 
 Escap Under Pressure at Hollywood.com
 Escape Under Pressure at All Movie

2000 films
2000 action films
2000s disaster films
American action films
American disaster films
2000s English-language films
Films about couples
Films about seafaring accidents or incidents
Films about ship hijackings
Underwater action films
Films directed by Jean Pellerin
2000s American films